Rose Hill is the location of one of the oldest and least-altered buildings in Southampton County, Virginia, USA. Located near Capron, the Federal style house was built in the early 19th century by Henry Blow, on land his father had acquired from the local Nottoway Indians in 1792. The site is also of archaeological interest, with documented native uses into the 20th century.

After the Civil War, James R. Kello Sr. purchased the property. He resided at the residence with his wife, Mariah Thomas Kello, until his death on May 18, 1908. James and Mariah raised their family in this home. Their ancestors still reside here today.

The property was listed on the National Register of Historic Places in 1979.

See also
National Register of Historic Places listings in Southampton County, Virginia

References

Houses on the National Register of Historic Places in Virginia
Houses completed in 1810
Buildings and structures in Southampton County, Virginia
Archaeological sites on the National Register of Historic Places in Virginia
National Register of Historic Places in Southampton County, Virginia